Edmund Pader (born 1913, date of death unknown) was an Austrian freestyle swimmer. He competed in three events at the 1936 Summer Olympics.

References

External links
 

1913 births
Year of death missing
Austrian male freestyle swimmers
Olympic swimmers of Austria
Swimmers at the 1936 Summer Olympics
Place of birth missing